Dan Stiles Wright (March 5, 1802 Shoreham, Addison County, Vermont – January 31, 1867 Whitehall, Washington County, New York) was an American physician and politician from New York.

Life
He was the son of Ebenezer Wright (1765–1845) and Lucretia (Wood) Wright (c. 1771–1808). He married first Eluthera Farnham. In 1830, he married Lucy Alvira Wadhams (1805–1884), and they had six children.

He was a member of the New York State Assembly (Washington Co.) in 1842.

He was a member of the New York State Senate (13th D.) in 1852 and 1853.

He was one of the founders, and for six terms Master, of the Phoenix Masonic Lodge, No. 96, in Whitehall. At some time he was Senior Grand Warden of the Grand Lodge of New York.

Sources
The New York Civil List compiled by Franklin Benjamin Hough (pages 137, 147, 227 and 318; Weed, Parsons and Co., 1858)
Wadhams/Wright genealogy, at Family Tree Maker
Hyde Genealogy by Reuben H. Walworth (1863; pg. 318)
Wadhams Genealogy by Harriet Weeks (Wadhams) Stevens (1913; pg. 265)
History of Masonic Lodges in New York

1802 births
1867 deaths
Members of the New York State Assembly
New York (state) state senators
New York (state) Whigs
19th-century American politicians
People from Shoreham, Vermont
People from Whitehall, New York
Physicians from New York (state)